Sir Michael Alan Willcocks,  (born 27 July 1944) is a retired officer of the British Army and former Gentleman Usher of the Black Rod for the Parliament of the United Kingdom's House of Lords.

Military career
Willcocks was commissioned into the Royal Regiment of Artillery in 1964. He was appointed Commanding Officer of 1st Regiment Royal Horse Artillery in 1983.

He became Deputy Assistant Chief of Staff at Headquarters UK Land Forces in 1985, Assistant Chief of Staff for Intelligence/Operations at Headquarters UK Land Forces in 1988 and Commander Royal Artillery for the 4th Armoured Division in 1989. He went on to be Assistant Chief of Staff for Land Operations at the Joint War Headquarters for the Gulf War in 1991, Director of Army Plans and Programme at the Ministry of Defence in 1991 and Director-General Land Warfare at the Ministry of Defence in 1993.

He was then appointed Chief of Staff for the Allied Command Europe Rapid Reaction Corps in 1994, Chief of Staff for the Land Component of the Peace Implementation Force (IFOR) in Bosnia and Herzegovina in 1995 and Assistant Chief of the General Staff in 1996. His last appointments were as Deputy Commander (Operations) for the Stabilization Force (SFOR) in Bosnia and Herzegovina from 1999 and as UK military representative to NATO and the European Union from 2000 until his retirement in 2001.

Black Rod
Willcocks was appointed Gentleman Usher of the Black Rod on 9 May 2001. After seven years in this post, he announced in late 2008 that he was stepping down from the role, and relinquished the post on 29 April 2009.

At Willcocks' first State Opening of Parliament, Dennis Skinner, MP, famous for interrupting Black Rod, said "You're nowt but a midget!" At Willcocks' last State Opening, Skinner asked, "any Tory moles at the Palace?", referring to the controversial then-recent arrest of Conservative MP Damian Green in connection with an investigation about receiving confidential information from a civil servant at the Home Office who had been a former Conservative Party candidate. In a mild, but highly memorable breach of protocol, Willcocks responded (interruptions are supposed to be ignored) "I shall miss you, Dennis", receiving laughter from other MPs. As Black Rod, Willcocks oversaw the Queen Mother's lying-in-state at Westminster Hall.

Willcocks was appointed a Knight Commander of the Order of the Bath in the New Year Honours 2000. The Queen invested him with the insignia of a Commander of the Royal Victorian Order on his retirement as Black Rod on 29 April 2009. He is also a Knight Commander of Merit with Star of the Sacred Military Constantinian Order of St George.

Other roles
Willcocks is also the current Charter Commissioner for the Press Complaints Commission.

References

External links
 NATO page
 Video of the "I Shall Miss You Dennis" incident, bbc.co.uk; accessed 23 October 2014.
 Reference to Sir Michael Willcocks, indcatholicnews.com; accessed 23 October 2014.
 Reference to Sir Michael Willcocks, theyworkforyou.com; accessed 23 October 2014.
 Reference to Sir Michael Willcocks, parl.gc.ca; accessed 23 October 2014.

|-

|-

1944 births
Living people
British Army generals
Commanders of the Royal Victorian Order
Knights Commander of the Order of the Bath
Royal Artillery officers
Graduates of the Royal Military Academy Sandhurst
Ushers of the Black Rod
People educated at St John's College, Portsmouth